"Ett herrans liv" (A hell of a life) is also the Swedish language-title for the film Monty Python's Life of Brian and the television series The Vicar of Dibley.

Ett herrans liv is a Swedish TV series that airs on Kanal 5. The hosts are Filip Hammar & Fredrik Wikingsson. On the show, the duo interview Swedish celebrities, many of which they've made fun of on their preceding shows. In the first season, every episode starts with the guest being kidnapped by the hosts. 

The show's theme song is I Wish by Skee-Lo.

Episode overview
Season 1: 

Season 2: 

Kanal 5 (Swedish TV channel) original programming
Swedish television talk shows